Vandergrift is a name. It may refer to:

Places
 East Vandergrift, Pennsylvania, a borough in Westmoreland County 
 North Vandergrift, Pennsylvania, a borough in Armstrong County
 North Vandergrift-Pleasant View, Pennsylvania, a borough in Armstrong County
 Vandergrift Historic District, a national historic district in Westmoreland County, Pennsylvania
 Vandergrift, Pennsylvania, a borough in Westmoreland County
 Vandergrift Pioneers, a minor league baseball team

See also
Vandegrift (disambiguation)